Banca di Valle Camonica S.p.A. was an Italian bank based in Breno, in the Province of Brescia, Lombardy. The bank is named after Val Camonica.

History
Founded in 1872, Banca di Valle Camonica was a subsidiary of Banca San Paolo di Brescia since 1963. The parent company merged with Credito Agrario Bresciano to form Banca Lombarda Group. In 2007, the bank became part of UBI Banca.

References

Defunct banks of Italy
Companies based in Lombardy
Buildings and structures in the Province of Brescia
Banks established in 1872
Italian companies established in 1872
Former UBI Banca subsidiaries